Robin James Lane Fox,  (born 5 October 1946) is an English classicist, ancient historian, and gardening writer known for his works on Alexander the Great. Lane Fox is an Emeritus Fellow of New College, Oxford and Reader in Ancient History, University of Oxford. Fellow and Tutor in Ancient History at New College from 1977 to 2014, he serves as Garden Master and as Extraordinary Lecturer in Ancient History for both New and Exeter Colleges.  He has also taught Greek and Latin literature and early Islamic history.

His major publications, for which he has won literary prizes including the James Tait Black Award, the Duff Cooper Prize, the Heinemann Award and the Runciman Award, include studies of Alexander the Great and Ancient Macedon, Late Antiquity, Christianity and Paganism, the Bible and history, and the Greek Dark Ages. In addition, he is the gardening correspondent of the Financial Times.

Early life
Lane Fox was educated at Eton College, an all-boys public school near Windsor, Berkshire. He studied Literae Humaniores (Classics) at Magdalen College, Oxford. Like his fellow ancient historians Paul Cartledge and Alan Cameron, and philosophers Terence Irwin and John McDowell, he was an undergraduate student of G. E. M. de Ste. Croix.

Academic career
Lane Fox was a fellow of Magdalen College, Oxford, from 1970 to 1973. From 1974 to 1976, he was a lecturer at Worcester College, Oxford. From 1976 to 1977, he was a research fellow in classical and Islamic history at Worcester. In 1977, he was elected a fellow of New College, Oxford, in succession to G. E. M. de Ste. Croix. In 1990, he was appointed Reader in Ancient History within the Faculty of Classics. In 2012, he retired and was appointed an Emeritus Fellow of New College. Important influences on his contributions to the study of ancient history include Louis Robert, Peter Brown, E. R. Dodds, Timothy Barnes, E. J. Bickerman, Martin Litchfield West, Walter Burkert, and his long-standing New College colleague W. G. (George) Forrest.

His 1973 book Alexander the Great was awarded the Duff Cooper Prize and the James Tait Black Memorial Prize. Due to the success of the book, Lane Fox was historical advisor to the film director Oliver Stone for the epic Alexander. His appearance as an extra in cavalry manoeuvres, in addition to his work as a historical consultant, was publicised at the time of the film's release. He also wrote and presented Greek Myths: Tales of Travelling Heroes, which was first broadcast on BBC Four at 9:00pm on 15 November 2010.

While primarily focused on ancient Greece, Fox has written three books dealing with the history of Christianity, Pagans and Christians, The Unauthorized Version: Truth and Fiction in the Bible, and most recently a biography of Saint Augustine, Augustine: Conversions and Confessions, which was awarded the Wolfson History Prize.

Personal life
Lane Fox, an atheist, is the father of Martha Lane Fox and of Henry Lane Fox. Martha is an entrepreneur and crossbench life peer who co-founded Lastminute.com. Henry is CEO of a website, The Browser.

As gardening correspondent of the Financial Times, Lane Fox is an outspoken opponent of garden gnomes.

References

External links

1946 births
Living people
People educated at Eton College
Alumni of Magdalen College, Oxford
English atheists
English garden writers
BBC television presenters
Fellows of New College, Oxford
Fellows of the Royal Society of Literature
Scholars of ancient Greek history
English classical scholars
James Tait Black Memorial Prize recipients
21st-century English writers
20th-century English historians
21st-century English historians
Robin